Alan Albert (born Alan Aufrichtig in Brooklyn, New York) is a sportscaster, who formerly called basketball games for the New York Nets and Denver Nuggets, as well as national NBA coverage for the USA Network. He was also a play-by-play sportscaster for the Indiana Pacers. He has also worked in boxing, as the blow-by-blow announcer for Tuesday Night Fights.

Education
Albert obtained his degree from Ohio University, where he played hockey and lacrosse. He played goalie for both sports. Albert was invited to training camp by the New York Rangers and ended up playing a single season for the Toledo Blades.

Career
Albert started his broadcasting career in Denver, working for a local broadcasting company called KOA and also KHOW radio and KWGN-TV. He also served as a sports anchor on WNBC in New York City and was the voice of the New York Nets and New York Islanders. He was the voice for the Nuggets for 21 years until he decided to leave Denver in 1996. In 1999, he joined the Indiana Pacers as a play-by-play man. He worked there until 2007.

On January 24, 1984, Albert, working for USA network, called what Syracuse fans call the greatest game in the Carrier Dome ever. Syracuse faced Boston College, and the teams were tied 73-73 after a missed free throw by Boston College's Martin Clark. Sean Kerins passed the rebound to Pearl Washington who took three steps and made a half court shot to win the game. Albert's call lives on as The Greatest Play By Play Call in the Carrier Dome ever: "Washington, two seconds, OHHHH! 'The Pearl' hits it ..at midcourt." Syracuse University basketball fans call that the greatest nine words in Syracuse history.

Awards and honors
In 1995, he won the Sam Taub Award for excellence in boxing broadcasting journalism.

Family
Albert hails from a family of broadcasters. His brothers, Marv and Steve Albert, and a nephew, Kenny, are also play-by-play sports commentators.

References

External links
 PACERS: Al Albert

Year of birth missing (living people)
Living people
American Basketball Association announcers
American television sports announcers
American radio sports announcers
Boxing commentators
College basketball announcers in the United States
Denver Nuggets announcers
Indiana Pacers announcers
Los Angeles Clippers announcers
Jewish American sportspeople
Major League Baseball broadcasters
National Basketball Association broadcasters
National Football League announcers
National Hockey League broadcasters
New York Islanders announcers
New York Rangers announcers
New York Nets announcers
New York Jets announcers
Ohio University alumni
Sportspeople from Brooklyn
Television anchors from New York City
Toledo Blades players
New Jersey Devils announcers
21st-century American Jews